Dobrovirus is a genus of viruses in the realm Ribozyviria, containing the single species Dobrovirus bufonis.

Host 
The Chusan Island toad (Bufo gargarizans) serves as its host.

References 

Virus genera